The General View series of county surveys was an initiative of the Board of Agriculture of Great Britain, of the early 1790s. Many of these works had second editions, in the 1810s.

The Board, set up by Sir John Sinclair, was generally a proponent of enclosures.

England

Ireland

Scotland

Wales

Other

General
William Marshall, who had written the Central Highlands survey, was a rival of Arthur Young, and at odds with him over the surveys. He wrote at length about the reports in 1808 to 1817, producing a five-volume Review, generally critical of the reports. William Lester's History of British Implements and Machinery applicable to Agriculture (1811) drew heavily on extracts from the surveys, where those covered agricultural implements. His introduction commented on the difficulty in referring farmers directly to the reports.

Sir John Sinclair wrote a number of related works:

General View of the Agriculture of the Northern Counties and Islands of Scotland (1795)
Account of the Origin of the Board of Agriculture and its Progress for Three Years after its Establishment (1796)
General Report of the Agricultural State and Political State of Scotland (1814)
Hints Regarding the Agricultural State of the Netherlands, Compared with that of Great Britain (1815)

Sources
http://www.bahs.org.uk/LIBRALall.html

Notes

History of agriculture in the United Kingdom
Series of books
1790s books
1800s books
1810s books